Madhaba Nanda Behera (1 July 1942 – 27 June 2016) was a defence personnel and socio-political leader from the state of Odisha in India. From Jagannath Prasad constituency, he was elected 3 times to the Odisha Legislative Assembly during the
10th (1990),
11th (1995),
and 13th (2004) assembly elections.
While in defence, he had participated in the wars with Pakistan in 1965 and with Bangladesh in 1971.

References 

Members of the Odisha Legislative Assembly
People from Ganjam district
Odisha politicians
Janata Dal politicians
Biju Janata Dal politicians
1942 births
2016 deaths